Edward Lovell Williams (15 September 1925 – 24 December 2013) was an English cricketer. Williams was a left-handed batsman who bowled right-arm fast-medium. He was born at Shaftesbury, Dorset.

Williams made a single first-class appearance for Leicestershire against Gloucestershire at Grace Road in the 1949 County Championship. In Leicestershire's first-innings of 195 all out, Williams was run out for 10 runs. In Gloucestershire's first-innings response of 449/8 declared, Williams took figures of 2/33 with the ball. In Leicestershire's second-innings of 172 all out, he was dismissed for 3 runs by Sam Cook. Gloucestershire won the match by an innings and 82 runs. This was his only major appearance for the county.

He died at Chester, Cheshire on 24 December 2013.

References

External links
Edward Williams at ESPNcricinfo
Edward Williams at CricketArchive

1925 births
2013 deaths
People from Shaftesbury
Cricketers from Dorset
English cricketers
Leicestershire cricketers